The women's 4 × 100 metre medley relay event at the 2022 Commonwealth Games was held on 3 August at the Sandwell Aquatics Centre.

Records
Prior to this competition, the existing world, Commonwealth and Games records were as follows:

Schedule
The schedule is as follows:

All times are British Summer Time (UTC+1)

Results

Final

References

Women's 4 x 100 metre medleyrelay
Commonwealth Games